Matthew Michael Murray (born September 26, 1970) is a former pitcher in Major League Baseball who played for the Atlanta Braves and Boston Red Sox during the  season. Listed at 6' 6", 240 lb., he batted left-handed and threw right-handed.

Murray entered the majors in 1995 with the Braves, appearing in six games for them before being traded along with Mike Stanton to Boston in exchange for two minor leaguers.

Murray posted a 0-3 record with four strikeouts and a 9.64 ERA in six appearances, including two starts, one game finished, and 14.0 innings of work.

See also
1995 Atlanta Braves season
1995 Boston Red Sox season

External links

Atlanta Braves players
Boston Red Sox players
Major League Baseball pitchers
Baseball players from Massachusetts
1970 births
Living people
Newburgh Black Diamonds players
Lehigh Valley Black Diamonds players
Catskill Cougars players
American expatriate baseball players in Taiwan
Brother Elephants players
Burlington Braves players
Durham Bulls players
Gulf Coast Braves players
Greenville Braves players
Macon Braves players
Pulaski Braves players
Richmond Braves players
Scranton/Wilkes-Barre Red Barons players
Sumter Braves players
Loomis Chaffee School alumni